Minuscule 111 (in the Gregory-Aland numbering), ε 267 (Soden), is a Greek minuscule manuscript of the New Testament, on parchment leaves. Palaeographically it has been assigned to the 12th century. It has complex contents. Marginalia are incomplete.

Description 

The codex contains the text of the four Gospels on 181 parchment leaves. The text is written in one column per page, 31 lines per page.

There is also another division according to the Ammonian Sections, but without references to the Eusebian Canons.

It has some lacunae in John 16:27-17:15; 20:25-21:25.

Text 
The Greek text of the codex is a representative of the Byzantine text-type. Aland placed it in Category V.

According to the Claremont Profile Method it represents textual family Kx in Luke 1 and Luke 20. In Luke 10 no profile was made. It belongs to the textual cluster 281.

History 

Nicoll (?) collated some places for Scholz. C. R. Gregory saw it in 1883.

It is housed at the Bodleian Library (E. D. Clarke 7) at Oxford.

See also 
 List of New Testament minuscules
 Biblical manuscript
 Textual criticism

References

Further reading 

 E. Colwell, "The Four Gospels of Karahissar", I, (Chicago, 1936) pp. 170–222.

Greek New Testament minuscules
12th-century biblical manuscripts
Bodleian Library collection